There have been three baronetcies created for persons with the surname Fleming, one in the Baronetage of Nova Scotia, one in the Baronetage of England and one in the Baronetage of Great Britain. As of 2008 one creation is extant, one extinct and one either extinct or dormant.

The Fleming Baronetcy, of Farme in the County of Glasgow, was created in the Baronetage of Nova Scotia on 25 September 1661 for Archibald Fleming. The title became either extinct or dormant on the death of the seventh Baronet in 1764.

The Fleming, later le Fleming Baronetcy, of Rydal, in the County of Cumberland was created in the Baronetage of England on 4 October 1705. For more information on this creation, see le Fleming baronets.

The Fleming Baronetcy, of Brompton Park in the County of Middlesex, was created in the Baronetage of Great Britain on 22 April 1763 for John Fleming. The title became extinct on his death later the same year.

Fleming baronets, of Farme (1661)
Sir Archibald Fleming, 1st Baronet (died 1662)
Sir William Fleming, 2nd Baronet (1639–1707)
Sir Archibald Fleming, 3rd Baronet (died 1714)
Sir Archibald Fleming, 4th Baronet (died 1738)
Sir Gilbert Fleming, 5th Baronet (died )
Sir William Fleming, 6th Baronet (1699–1746)
Sir Collingwood Fleming, 7th Baronet (died 1764)

Fleming, later le Fleming baronets, of Rydal (1705)
see le Fleming baronets

Fleming baronets, of Brompton Park (1763)

 Sir John Fleming, 1st Baronet (c. 1701–1763)

References

Kidd, Charles, Williamson, David (editors). Debrett's Peerage and Baronetage (1990 edition). New York: St Martin's Press, 1990.

Baronetcies in the Baronetage of England
Dormant baronetcies in the Baronetage of Nova Scotia
Extinct baronetcies in the Baronetage of the United Kingdom
1661 establishments in England
1763 establishments in Great Britain